Free is an album by Brazilian jazz drummer and percussionist Airto Moreira (who was credited as "Airto") with performances recorded in 1972. The album was released by CTI Records and reached No. 30 on the jazz album chart at Billboard magazine.

Reception
At AllMusic, critic Scott Yanow writes that the album combines "jazz, Brazilian music, and aspects of fusion and funk quite successfully."

Track listing

Personnel
Adapted from AllMusic
 Airto Moreira – percussion, vocals
 Burt Collins – trumpet, flugelhorn
 Mel Davis – trumpet, flugelhorn
 Alan Rubin – trumpet, flugelhorn
 Wayne Andre – trombone
 Garnett Brown – trombone
 Joe Wallace – trombone
 Joe Farrell – soprano saxophone, alto and bass flutes, piccolo
 Hubert Laws – flute
 Nelson Ayres – electric piano
 Chick Corea – piano, electric piano
 Keith Jarrett – piano
 George Benson – guitar
 Jay Berliner – guitar
 Ron Carter – double bass
 Stanley Clarke – bass guitar
 Flora Purim – vocals
 Don Sebesky – arranger

Charts

References

CTI Records albums
Airto Moreira albums
1972 albums
Albums produced by Creed Taylor
Albums arranged by Don Sebesky
Albums recorded at Van Gelder Studio